Lewis Dayton (born Henry Wallenstein Ryan Lewis; 3 February 1888 – January 1963) was a British actor who appeared in a number of films during the silent and early sound eras, largely in supporting roles but occasionally in the male lead.

Selected filmography
 A Daughter of Uncle Sam (1918)
 The Shadow Between (1920)
 A Rank Outsider (1920)
 The Great Day (1921)
 The Marriage Lines (1921)
 The Mystery of Mr. Bernard Brown (1921)
 The Lilac Sunbonnet (1922)
 Yesterday's Wife (1923)
 Slander the Woman (1923)
 A Wife's Romance (1923)
 Cordelia the Magnificent (1923)
 The Cost of Beauty (1924)
 Around a Million (1924)
 What Fools Men (1925)
 Spangles (1928)
 S.O.S. (1928)
 The Celestial City (1929)
 The Runaway Princess (1929)
 Lloyd of the C.I.D. (1932)
 The Strangler (1932)

References

Bibliography
 Low, Rachael. History of the British Film, 1918-1929. George Allen & Unwin, 1971.

External links

 

1889 births
Year of death unknown
English male film actors
English male silent film actors
People from Brighton
20th-century English male actors